Anolis lynchi, Lynch's anole, is a species of lizard in the family Dactyloidae. The species is found in Colombia and Ecuador.

References

Anoles
Reptiles described in 1985
Reptiles of Colombia
Reptiles of Ecuador